In robotics one often combines external sensory input and motor kinematics. A Sensory Motor-Map(SMM) is a map between the perception system of the robot and an action performed by the robot. The map gives the robot an understanding of how certain motor actions affect the perceived reality by relating the kinematics and dynamics used by the robot to achieve the external sensory input.

References

Montesano, L., Lopes, M., Bernardino, A., and Santos-Victor, J. (2008). "Learning Object Affordances: From Sensory--Motor Coordination to Imitation", Robotics, IEEE Transactions on, 24(1), 15–26.

Robot control